Obi Emelonye Emelonye  a Nigerian film director. He is known for directing award-winning films such as Last Flight to Abuja (2012), The Mirror Boy (2011), and Onye Ozi (2013).

In 2020 during the coronavirus pandemic, which shut down businesses globally, Obi Emelonye became the first film director to make a movie via Zoom, by working remotely with cast members in London and Lagos. The movie, Heart 2 Heart, received critical acclaim from major media outlets all over the world.

In December 2022, Obi Emelonye was presented with the British Urban Film Festival honorary award by producer/director Don Omope for a 20+ year outstanding contribution to cinema at a ceremony in London.

Education
Obi Emelonye, a former professional footballer and law professional, graduated from the University of Nigeria, Nsukka, with BA (Hons) Theatre Arts degree (1990). He went on to study for an LLB Law degree from the University of Wolverhampton (1998). He completed a post-graduate degree in Legal Practice from London Metropolitan University (2002) and practised Law for a few years before focusing on his first love, film. In 2019, Obi Emelonye acquired certifications to become a Chartered Management consultant. He is a member of the UK Directors Guild as well as the British Film Institute (BFI).

Filmography
 Black Mail - 2022
 Badamasi - 2021
Crazy Lovely, Cool - 2018
 The Calabash (featuring Princess Halliday, Collete Nwadike, Alex Nwokedi, Bayray McNwizu, Lisa Omorodion, Enyinna Nwigwe, Uru Eke, Chris Okagbue) - 2015
 Thy Will Be Done - 2015
 Onye Ozi (The Messenger) - 2013
 Oxford Gardens- 2013
 Last Flight to Abuja - 2012
 The Mirror Boy - 2011
 The London Successor - 2006
 Lucky Joe - 2006
 Echoes of War - 2004
 Money Miss Road

Awards and nominations

References

External links

Nigerian film directors
1967 births
Films directed by Obi Emelonye
Living people
University of Nigeria alumni
University of Nigeria people
Alumni of the University of Wolverhampton